Eleftheriou Venizelou Street is a street in the south-central part of Patras, Greece. It was named after Greek prime minister Eleftherios Venizelos. It runs from the coastal boulevard Akti Dymaion east to Pontiou Ellinismou Square. 

Streets and squares in Patras